Charles D. Barber   (1854 – November 23, 1910) was a 19th-century baseball third baseman for the Cincinnati Outlaw Reds of the Union Association in 1884. He appeared in 55 games for the Reds and hit .201. He continued to play professionally in the minor leagues until 1887 in the New England League.

References

External links

1854 births
1910 deaths
Major League Baseball third basemen
Cincinnati Outlaw Reds players
19th-century baseball players
Baseball players from Pennsylvania
Philadelphia Athletics (minor league) players
Wilmington Quicksteps (minor league) players
Birmingham (minor league baseball) players
Altoona Mountain Cities players
Portland (minor league baseball) players
Haverhill (minor league baseball) players